Homochira is a genus of moths in the subfamily Lymantriinae. The genus was erected by George Hampson in 1905.

Species
Homochira rendalli (Distant, 1897) southern Africa
Homochira crenulata (Bethune-Baker, 1911) Nigeria
Homochira gephyra (Hering, 1926)
Homochira mintha (Fawcett, 1918) eastern Africa
Homochira poecilosticta Collenette, 1938 Mozambique

References

Lymantriinae